is a 1995 Japanese original video horror film directed by Katsuya Matsumura. It was released on February 10, 1995.

Cast
Masahito Takahashi
Masashi Endo as Shun'ichi Noda
Takamitsu Okubo
Ryoka Yuzuki as Sayaka Mizukami

Reception
On Midnight Eye, Tom Mes said that the film "is still not a masterpiece by any standards" "but it certainly packs a serious punch".

See also
All Night Long (1992 film)
All Night Long 3 (1996)

References

External links

1995 direct-to-video films
1995 horror films
Direct-to-video horror films
Films directed by Katsuya Matsumura
Japanese direct-to-video films
Japanese horror films
1995 films
Japanese LGBT-related films
Gay-related films
1990s Japanese films